Seletar Bus Depot, formerly named Sungei Seletar Bus Depot, is the third bus depot to be built by the Land Transport Authority in Singapore. It is located off Yio Chu Kang Road and houses 29 services under the Seletar Bus Package.

Completed in 2017, the new bus depot is able to accommodate about 500 buses and be equipped with facilities for daily bus operations, bus maintenance and a rest area for bus drivers. An access road (Yio Chu Kang Crescent) was built to serve the depot. The depot was officially opened by Minister for Transport Khaw Boon Wan on 27 January 2018.

History
On 7 June 2016, the Land Transport Authority called for tenders to operate 26 routes based at Ang Mo Kio Bus Interchange, Yio Chu Kang Bus Interchange, and Yishun Bus Interchange out of the new depot as part of its new contracting model. The bus services will be operated by the successful tenderer for a service term of five years, with a possible two-year extension based on good performance. On 19 April 2017, the Land Transport Authority awarded the bus package to SBS Transit. SBS Transit took over the services in the bus package in three tranches in March 2018, as SBS Transit was already operating about half of the bus services.

References

Bus garages
Bus stations in Singapore
2018 establishments in Singapore